Ruth Barbara Wood (19 March 1917 – 1998) was an English cricketer who played as a pace bowler. She appeared in one Test match for England in 1949, against Australia. She played domestic cricket for Yorkshire.

In her only test innings, batting at 10, she scored 4 runs before being stumped. She took one wicket for 53 in Australia's first innings. The match, the second of the series, was drawn in three days.

References

External links
 
 

1917 births
1998 deaths
Place of birth missing
England women Test cricketers
Yorkshire women cricketers